Peter Zelinka (1 May 1957 – 27 October 2021) was a Slovak biathlete. He competed at the 1980 Winter Olympics and the 1984 Winter Olympics. Zelinka died on 27 October 2021, at the age of 64.

References

External links
 

1957 births
2021 deaths
Slovak male biathletes
Olympic biathletes of Czechoslovakia
Biathletes at the 1980 Winter Olympics
Biathletes at the 1984 Winter Olympics
Sportspeople from Bratislava